Pitcairnia funkiae is a plant species in the genus Pitcairnia. This species is native to Costa Rica.

References

funkiae
Flora of Costa Rica